Kalus-e Sofla (also Romanized as Kālūs-e Soflá; also known as Kālūs-e Pā’īn and Kālūs Pā’īn) is a village in Sarrud-e Jonubi Rural District, in the Central District of Boyer-Ahmad County, Kohgiluyeh and Boyer-Ahmad Province, Iran. At the 2006 census, its population was 264, in 55 families.

References 

Populated places in Boyer-Ahmad County